Hoare is one of the forty subbarrios of Santurce, San Juan, Puerto Rico.

Demographics
In 2000, Hoare had a population of 3.

In 2010, Hoare had a population of 158 and a population density of 1,128.6 persons per square mile.

Places
The Puerto Rico Department of Education books' printing house is located in Hoare.

Notable incidents
Kevin Fret, a rapper, was gunned down while riding his motorcycle in Hoare and was treated for his injuries and died in the Hoare Hospital.

See also 
 
 List of communities in Puerto Rico

References

Santurce, San Juan, Puerto Rico
Municipality of San Juan